Medowie is a suburb of the Port Stephens local government area in the Hunter Region of New South Wales, Australia. The Worimi people are the traditional owners of the Port Stephens area.

Medowie is home to a Rural Fire Station, formed in 1946.

The town has two government primary schools (Medowie Public School and Wirreanda Public School) as well as a Christian school (Medowie Christian School).  Catherine McAuley Catholic College is a Catholic co-ed high school which has opened as of 2021. A large residential golf course is located at the southern end of the town.

Medowie is also home to many sporting clubs supporting soccer, cricket, rugby union, golf, AFL, netball, tennis as well as Little Athletics.

Notes

References

Suburbs of Port Stephens Council
Towns in the Hunter Region